Pamela June Crook  (born 1945), known professionally as P J Crook, is an English painter and sculptor. Her shows have appeared in  London,  France, the United States, Japan, Canada, and Estonia. Her professional name "P J Crook" lacks full stops; variant stylings such as "P. J. Crook" have appeared.

Crook was born in 1945 in Cheltenham, England, where she still lives. She is represented by the Panter & Hall gallery on Pall Mall in London and Galerie Alain Blondel in Paris.

Art
From a studio opposite her house, she manages compositions on a monumental scale — paintings can measure 2 × 4.5 metres and also paints small pictures, some no larger than 10 cm square. She works in tinted gesso, acrylic and sometimes in oil on canvas. She often paints crowds, either in motion in urban environments or standing still reading newspapers, many of which are on undulating 3D corrugated structures as with 'The Smell of the Horse, the Roar of the Crowd" (coll. Cheltenham Art Gallery & Museum),"Other Mothers' Sons" (coll. Imperial War Museum, London) "Paper Hat" and "The Kiss" (coll. Morohashi Museum of Modern Art, Japan). These have led onto her three dimensional sculptures mainly constructed out of found objects.

In 1996, Crook co-starred with musician Toyah Wilcox on the HTV short film Rolinda Sharples: Painted out of History. The production led to a friendship between the two, and later on to Wilcox's husband, King Crimson/ProjeKcts guitarist Robert Fripp. Wilcox and Fripp own some of Crook's paintings, and the latter has used them as covers for his group's releases.

Distinctions: patronage, trusts and honours
Crook is a Patron of the National Star College Cheltenham; a Patron of Linc; a Patron of Artshape; a sometime Trustee and director of ACS (the Artists' Collecting Society);  Patron of Cheltenham Open Studios; a Gloucestershire Ambassador; President of the Friends of Cheltenham Art Gallery & Museum; member of the Royal West of England Academy; Manchester Academy of Fine Arts. She is a member of the Chelsea Arts Club and the Honourable Company of Gloucestershire. 
PJ Crook has an honorary Doctor of Arts from the University of Gloucestershire and is an honorary vice President of Gloucestershire College.

Crook was appointed Member of the Order of the British Empire (MBE) in the 2011 Birthday Honours for services to art.

List of King Crimson album covers
PJ Crook's  paintings are featured on the covers of many King Crimson albums. Many of these albums are produced by Discipline Global Mobile (DGM), the music company founded by Robert Fripp. Crook retains the copyrights and moral rights to her artwork.

References

External links
 Official website includes recent exhibitions (with photos), works in progress (with photos), biography, dealers, contact information, charitable activities, diary

1945 births
Living people
Discipline Global Mobile artists
English women painters
Members of the Order of the British Empire
Members of the Royal West of England Academy
People from Cheltenham
21st-century British women artists
21st-century English women
21st-century English people
Album-cover and concert-poster artists